Priocera is a genus of checkered beetles in the family Cleridae. There are about seven described species in Priocera.

Species
These seven species belong to the genus Priocera:
 Priocera apicalis Thomson, 1860 g
 Priocera aurosignata
 Priocera castanea (Newman, 1838) i c g b
 Priocera catalinae Cazier, 1939 i c g
 Priocera chiricahuae Knull, 1939 i c g b
 Priocera pusilla Kirby, 1826 i c g
 Priocera quadrigibbosa Thomson, 1860 g
 Priocera spinosa (Fabricius, 1801) g
Data sources: i = ITIS, c = Catalogue of Life, g = GBIF, b = Bugguide.net

References

External links

 
 

Cleridae genera
Clerinae